E. R. Thomas Motor Company was a manufacturer of motorized bicycles, motorized tricycles, motorcycles, and automobiles in Buffalo, New York between 1900 and 1919.

Motorized bicycles, tricycles, and motorcycles
In 1896, Edwin Ross Thomas (1850–1936) of Buffalo, New York began selling gasoline engine kits for propelling ordinary bicycles.  After forming the Thomas Motor Company, he began selling complete motor-assisted bicycles under the name Thomas Auto-Bi.  The Auto-Bi is generally considered to be the first production motorized bicycle made in the United States.  By 1903, the company was the largest manufacturer of single-cylinder, air-cooled engines.  The Thomas Auto-Bi was later joined by the Auto-Tri, a three-wheeled motorcycle, and the Auto-Two Tri, a motorcycle that could hold three riders.

In 1905, the Thomas Auto-Bi established a new record for a transcontinental crossing of the United States in 48 days.  By 1912, the demand for motorcycles had dropped significantly, and the Thomas Motor company discontinued all production of two-wheeled machines.

Automobiles

The E.R. Thomas Motor Company built automobiles from 1902 to 1919. The first Models were the 1902 Model 17, which was available in either a detachable rear entrance tonneau or runabout, equipped with a single cylinder 8hp and 2 speed planetary transmission. This was followed in January 1903 by the Model 18 with its sliding selective transmission and non-detachable tonneau with rear entrance or runabout body styles. Both the Model 17 and 18 sold side by side until stocks of the Model 17 were sold out in April-May 1903. The 1904 Thomas was the first Thomas to bear the "Flyer" name a touring car model and was the first multi cylinder vehicle produced by the firm. It was a 3 cylinder with planetary transmission on the earlier cars late change to the trans axle transmission that would continue for many years.  Equipped with a tonneau, it could seat 5 passengers and sold for US$2500 ($ in  dollars ).  The vertically mounted water-cooled straight-3, situated at the front of the car, produced 24 hp (17.9 kW).  The steel-framed car weighed 1900 lb (862 kg).  A modern cellular radiator was used for cooling.  An 8 hp (6 kW) tonneau model sold for US$1250 ($ in  dollars ).  In 1912 the company went into receivership and was purchased by Empire Smelting & Refining Company owner C.A. Finnegan. E.R. Thomas was finally shut down between 1918 and 1919.

New York to Paris Race

A 1907 Model 35 with 4 cylinders and 60 horsepower, dubbed Thomas Flyer, won the 1908 New York to Paris Race, the first and only around-the-world automobile race ever held. Six teams started the race (one Italian, one German, three French (De Dion-Bouton, Motobloc, and Sizaire-Naudin), and the American Flyer). Only three of the cars finished, the Thomas Flyer which won, the German Protos, and the Italian Züst. The original intent was to drive the full distance using the frozen Bering Strait to drive across the Pacific Ocean. In the course of the race, the Flyer was the first car to cross the United States taking 41 days 8 hours and 15 minutes, and the first to do so in the winter with George Schuster the first automobile driver to ever make the transcontinental winter crossing of the US. Finishing in 169 days was a remarkable feat, considering the lack of roads and services in 1908. Schuster, the driver, was the only member of the Thomas crew to go the full distance.

The Flyer survived and was restored to the exact condition it entered Paris on that day by William F. Harrah. It is now on exhibit at the National Automobile Museum in Reno, Nevada.

The Germans arrived in Paris on July 26, 1908. The American Flyer arrived at the edge of the city on July 30, and initially was not allowed into Paris by police because it had a broken headlamp. A passerby offered the team a bicycle light. With no tools to remove the light, they simply strapped the bike on the Thomas Flyer so they could enter Paris and finish the race.
It was later discovered the Protos took some shortcuts on its path and was penalized, so the American team that actually arrived second was declared the official winner of the epic race.

The 1965 Warner Brothers movie The Great Race is inspired by the 1908 New York to Paris race and the hero's car, the Leslie Special, is documented to be inspired by the Thomas flyer.

See also
 Brass Era car
 List of defunct United States automobile manufacturers
 Charles T. Hinde

References

 Rafferty, Tod, The Complete Illustrated Encyclopedia of American Motorcycles, Philadelphia, PA: Courage Books (1999)
 Frank Leslie's Popular Monthly (January 1904)
 Schuster & Mahoney, The Longest Auto Race, New York, NY: The John Day Company (1966)
 The Great Auto Race of 1908

External links
 
 1908 New York to Paris Race 

Motor vehicle manufacturers based in New York (state)
Defunct motor vehicle manufacturers of the United States
Manufacturing companies based in Buffalo, New York
Cars introduced in 1902
1900s cars
1910s cars
Brass Era vehicles
Motorized bicycles
Veteran vehicles
American companies established in 1900
Vehicle manufacturing companies established in 1900
Vehicle manufacturing companies disestablished in 1919
1900 establishments in New York (state)
1919 disestablishments in New York (state)
Defunct manufacturing companies based in New York (state)
History of Buffalo, New York
American companies disestablished in 1919